Morris P. Rainville, born Maurice Rainville, is a Canadian country music artist from Greater Sudbury. Morris is also part of a duo The Rainvilles with his spouse, Dot. Rainville's debut album, The Mississauga Man, was released in 1993. His 1990 single "Always Hum a Song in Your Soul" reached the Top 10 of the RPM Country Tracks chart.

Discography

Albums

Singles

References

External links
Morris P. Rainville on Myspace

Canadian country singer-songwriters
Canadian male singer-songwriters
Living people
Musicians from Greater Sudbury
Franco-Ontarian people
Year of birth missing (living people)